Below are the rosters for teams competing in the 2019 World Junior Ice Hockey Championships.

Group A

Head coach:  Tim Hunter

Head coach:  Vaclav Varada

Head coach:  Olaf Eller

Head coach:  Valeri Bragin

Head coach:  Christian Wohlwend

Group B

Head coach:  Jussi Ahokas

Head coach:

Head coach:  Ernest Bokroš

Head coach:  Tomas Montén

Head coach:  Mike Hastings

External links
WM20 - International Ice Hockey Federation

Rosters
World Junior Ice Hockey Championships rosters